The Mayor of Sanem is the mayor of the Luxembourgian commune of Sanem.

List of Mayors of Sanem

Footnotes

References
  Les bourgmestres de la Commune de Sanem de 1799 à aujourd'hui.  Commune of Sanem official website.  Retrieved on 2006-09-03.

Sanem